Michael Young (born 31 December 1988) is a Scrum half for Rugby Union team Newcastle Falcons in the Aviva Premiership. He is a product of West Hartlepool Rugby Club junior academy.

Club career
He played for the Newcastle Falcons Middlesex Sevens side, helping them to the title in 2007. In 2008 he made his senior debut for the club, making 79 appearances in his three full seasons. Young moved to Leicester in 2011, remaining there until 2013 during which time Leicester won the premiership in 2013 and Anglo-Welsh Cup in 2012. In 2013 Young signed for Leicester's premiership rival, Bath.

On 5 February 2015, it was announced Young had re-signed for Newcastle Falcons.

International career
Young has represented the England Sevens team, most notably in May 2009 when he scored the winning try against New Zealand in the final of the London Sevens tournament.

In June 2009 Young was selected for the England Saxons, scoring a try on his debut against the USA in the Churchill Cup. He also helped the Saxons to victory in the last Churchill Cup in 2011, coming off the bench in the final against Canada. In 2011 Young played for England in an uncapped match as a replacement against the Barbarians.

Young received his first call up to the senior England squad by coach Eddie Jones on 8 May 2016 for a three-day training squad.

References

External links
 England Saxons Profile
 Leicester Tigers Profile

1988 births
Living people
English rugby union players
Bath Rugby players
Rugby union players from Hartlepool
Rugby union scrum-halves
West Hartlepool R.F.C. players
Leicester Tigers players
Newcastle Falcons players